Conospermum spectabile is a shrub endemic to Western Australia.

Description
It blooms between October and November producing blue-white flowers.

Distribution
It is found in the Great Southern region of Western Australia where it grows in sandy soils.

References

External links

Eudicots of Western Australia
spectabile
Endemic flora of Western Australia
Plants described in 1995